The 2014 Canberra Raiders season was the 33rd season in the club's history. They competed in the 2014 NRL season.

Ladder

References

Canberra Raiders seasons
Canberra Raiders season